Conospermum multispicatum is a shrub endemic to Western Australia.

It blooms between September and December producing white flowers.

It is found on gentle slopes and flats along the west coast in the southern Wheatbelt and Great Southern regions of Western Australia where it grows in sandy or clay soils.

References

External links

Eudicots of Western Australia
multispicatum
Endemic flora of Western Australia
Plants described in 1995